Jacob Thomas Murphy (born September 21, 1989) is a former American football tight end. He was signed by the Oakland Raiders as an undrafted free agent in 2014. He played college football at the University of Utah.

Professional career

Oakland Raiders
Murphy decided to forego his senior year at the University of Utah to declare for the 2014 NFL Draft. After going unselected in the draft, he signed with the Oakland Raiders on May 10, 2014.

Miami Dolphins
On September 23, 2014, Murphy was signed to the Miami Dolphins' practice squad.

Cincinnati Bengals
Murphy was signed to the practice squad of the Cincinnati Bengals on November 3, 2014.

He was waived on August 19, 2015.

Denver Broncos
The Denver Broncos claimed Murphy off waivers on August 20, 2015. On August 31, 2015, he was released by the Broncos.

Personal
Murphy is the son of Dale Murphy, a former Major League Baseball outfielder (1976–93).

References

External links
NFL Combine Profile
Oakland Raiders bio
Utah Utes bio

1989 births
Living people
American football tight ends
Oakland Raiders players
Miami Dolphins players
Denver Broncos players
Utah Utes football players